Cadorin is a surname. Notable people with the surname include:

Chrissy Cadorin (born 1980), Canadian curler
Ettore Cadorin (1876–1952), American sculptor and teacher
Ludovico Cadorin (1824–1892), Italian architect
Mattia Cadorin (mid-17th century), Italian engraver and publisher
Serge Cadorin (1961–2007), Belgian footballer